Morris LaGrand (born February 9, 1953) is a former American football running back. He played for the Kansas City Chiefs and New Orleans Saints in 1975.

References

1953 births
Living people
American football running backs
Tampa Spartans football players
Kansas City Chiefs players
New Orleans Saints players